Starlight Place, is a shopping mall located in Chongqing, People's Republic of China. Designed by the architectural firm Aedas, it officially opened in 2012.  

Dominating Jiang Nan Avenue, Starlight Place was designed to become a landmark building that celebrates Nanping district as the southern gateway to the city centre.  

Unlike  other cities in China, Chongqing has very little direct sunlight and so Starlight Place has a generous glass atrium skylight to bring natural daylight deep into the public spaces of the shopping mall.

Tenants
Notable tenants include Gucci, CRC Vanguard, H&M, Max & Co., DKNY, Juicy Couture, Armani Jeans, Miss Sixty, Adidas Originals, MUJI, and Jinyi IMAX cinema. It also has several restaurants such as South Beauty. This shopping mall has the largest Apple Retailer and flagship Zara store in Chongqing, as well as the city’s very first Costa Coffee. It also has the very first GAP store in the whole of southwest China.

Starlight Place is owned and managed by Sincere.

Awards
Starlight Place was named RLI International Retail and Leisure Destination 2013 at Retail and Leisure International’s (RLI) Global RLI Awards 2013 held on 6 June 2013 in London.

References

Shopping malls in Chongqing
Commercial buildings completed in 2011
Shopping malls established in 2011
Chinese companies established in 2011
Aedas buildings